A Lesson in the Abuse of Information Technology is the debut studio album by American punk rock band The Menzingers. The album was recorded in "like two weeks, maybe just 10 days," according to Barnett. It was released on July 17, 2007 through Go-Kart Records, who they signed to after being featured in a profile piece on Punknews.org. In October and November 2007, the embarked on a tour of the US, which included an appearance at The Fest. They played a shows shows with Young Hearts in February 2008. In June 2008, the band went on a US tour with the Leftovers. They then appeared at The Fest in Florida in October 2008. They played a handful of shows with Captain, We're Sinking in January 2009, and some with Jena Berlin in March 2009.

Reception

Punknews.org ranked the album at number 14 on their list of the year's 20 best releases.

Track listing
All songs written by The Menzingers except 'Straight to Hell' by The Clash.

Personnel
Personnel for A Lesson in Abuse of Information Technology, according to album liner notes.

The Menzingers
Tom May – Guitar, Vocals
Joe Godino – Drums
Greg Barnett – Guitar, Vocals
Eric Keen – Bass

Production credits
Jesse Cannon – Produced, mixed, and recorded at Cannon Found Soundation
Alan Douches – Mastered at West West Side Mastering
Evan Hughes – All artwork
Additional engineering by Matt Mesiano and Mike Oettinger

References

2007 albums
The Menzingers albums
Go-Kart Records albums